Wesley John Skoglund (born June 9, 1945) is an American politician in the state of Minnesota. He served in the Minnesota House of Representatives and Minnesota State Senate.

References

1945 births
Living people
Democratic Party members of the Minnesota House of Representatives
Democratic Party Minnesota state senators